The men's event of the 2012 Masters Grand Slam of Curling was held from November 14 to 18 at the Wayne Gretzky Sports Centre, the Brantford Golf & Curling Club and the Brant Curling Club in Brantford, Ontario as part of the 2012–13 World Curling Tour. Some of the men's Tier I round robin games were held at the Brantford Golf & Curling Club, while the remainder of the Tier I games and the playoffs round games were held at the Wayne Gretzky Sports Centre. The men's Tier II games and playoffs qualifiers were held at the Brant Curling Club. It was held as the first Grand Slam event on the men's tour.

In the final, Kevin Koe of Alberta defeated Jim Cotter of British Columbia with a score of 7–5.

The event is split up into two tiers, with 18 teams in Tier I and 16 teams in Tier II. The Tier I teams were divided into 3 pools of 6 teams which played in a round robin, while the Tier II teams played off in a triple knockout event. 8 Tier II teams qualified for a playoff to determine which two teams would enter the playoffs along with six Tier I teams.

Tier I

Teams

The teams are listed as follows:

Round-robin standings
Final round-robin standings

Round-robin results
All draw times are listed in Eastern Standard Time.

Draw 1
Wednesday, November 14, 19:00

Draw 2
Thursday, November 14, 8:30

Draw 3
Thursday, November 14, 12:00

Draw 4
Thursday, November 14, 15:30

Draw 5
Thursday, November 14, 19:30

Draw 6
Friday, November 15, 8:30

Draw 7
Friday, November 15, 12:00

Draw 8
Friday, November 15, 15:30

Draw 9
Friday, November 15, 19:00

Tiebreakers
Saturday, November 17, 8:30

Saturday, November 17, 12:00

Tier II

Teams
The teams are listed as follows:

Knockout Draw Brackets
The draw is listed as follows:

A event

B event

C event

Knockout results
All draw times are listed in Eastern Standard Time.

Draw 1
Thursday, November 14, 8:30

Draw 2
Thursday, November 14, 11:30

Draw 3
Thursday, November 14, 14:30

Draw 4
Thursday, November 14, 17:30

Draw 5
Thursday, November 14, 20:30

Draw 6
Friday, November 15, 8:30

Draw 7
Friday, November 15, 12:30

Draw 8
Friday, November 15, 16:30

Draw 9
Friday, November 15, 20:30

Playoffs qualifiers

Results
Saturday, November 16, 8:30

Saturday, November 16, 12:00

Playoffs

Quarterfinals
Saturday, November 17, 15:30

Saturday, November 17, 19:30

Semifinals
Sunday, November 18, 8:00

Final
Sunday, November 18, 13:00

References

External links

2012 in curling